Maria Pilar Romero (born 22 May 1982) is a team handball player from Argentina. She defends Argentina, such as at the 2011 World Women's Handball Championship in Brazil.

References

1982 births
Living people
Argentine female handball players
Pan American Games medalists in handball
Pan American Games silver medalists for Argentina
Handball players at the 2011 Pan American Games
Medalists at the 2011 Pan American Games
21st-century Argentine women